The Grand Jury Prize is an award given at the Venice Film Festival to one of the feature films in competition slate since 1951. It is considered the second place award next to the main award, the Golden Lion.

Name
Since 2016, the official name of the award has been simply the Grand Jury Prize, but it has had several other names since its creation in 1951: Special Jury Prize (awarded from 1951 to 1982; and from 2006 to 2012);  and Grand Special Jury Prize (awarded from 1983 to 2005; and from 2013 to 2015).

Winners

 Notes
 # Denotes Ex-aequo win
 * Special Award given for the ensemble acting of the film.

Multiple winners

The following individuals received two or more Grand Jury Prize awards:

See also 
 Golden Lion
 Special Jury Prize

References

External links
The Venice Film Festival at the IMDb

Venice Film Festival
 
Italian film awards
Lists of films by award